Mohamed Morabet (born 31 January 1998) is a German-Moroccan professional footballer who plays as a midfielder for 1. FC Kaiserslautern.

References

External links
 

Living people
1998 births
Footballers from Frankfurt
Association football midfielders
German footballers
Moroccan footballers
German people of Moroccan descent
FSV Frankfurt players
1. FC Kaiserslautern players
VfR Aalen players
3. Liga players
Regionalliga players